Itsi Bitsi, also known as Steppeulven, is a 2014 Danish drama film directed by Ole Christian Madsen. It is a biopic of the band Steppeulvene. It was screened in the Contemporary World Cinema section at the 2014 Toronto International Film Festival.

Cast and characters
 Joachim Fjeldstrup as Eik Skaløe
 Thure Lindhardt as Eik's father
 Ola Rapace as Vincent
 Julia Ragnarsson as Majbritt
 Christian Gade Bjerrum as Christian Arnø
 Anette Støvelbæk as Eik's mother
 Marie Tourell Søderberg as Iben Nagel Rasmussen
  as Henrik
 Caspar Phillipson as Halfdan Rasmussen
 Joachim Fjelstrup as Eik Skaløe

References

External links
 

2014 drama films
2014 films
Danish drama films
Danish rock music films
2010s Danish-language films
Films directed by Ole Christian Madsen